Pyripnoa is a genus of moths of the family Noctuidae. The genus was described by Turner in 1920.

Species
 Pyripnoa auricularia Lucas, 1894
 Pyripnoa pyraspis Meyrick, 1891
 Pyripnoa sciaptera Lower, 1903

References

Acontiinae